The Zig Zag Railway is an Australian heritage railway, situated near Lithgow, New South Wales. It was opened by the not-for-profit Zig Zag Railway Co-op as an unpaid volunteer-staffed heritage railway in October 1975, using the alignment of the Lithgow Zig Zag line that formed part of the Main Western line between 1869 and 1910. The line climbs the western flank of the Blue Mountains, using railway zig zags to gain height.

Operation of the heritage railway was suspended in 2012 following accreditation issues with the Government of New South Wales. The railway was aiming to resume services in October 2013, but was then severely damaged during the 2013 NSW Bushfires and then subsequently by torrential rain. Repairs are ongoing and trials of restored rail vehicles and track commenced in August 2016 and it was planned to re-commence limited heritage operations in 2019, until the 2019-2020 bushfires damaged key infrastructure. The COVID-19 pandemic further delayed restoration and plans are now planning for the resumption of heritage train services in early 2023.

History

Construction and abandonment

The Lithgow Zig Zag was constructed as part of the Main Western line and opened on the 19 October 1869. The alternative eventually decided upon required the use of two railway zig zags where all trains had to reverse. The line had a ruling grade of 1:42 (~2.38%) on three inclines known as the Top Road (above Top Points), Middle Road (between the two zig zags) and Bottom Road (below Bottom Points). The line included several short tunnels and some viaducts.

The steep gradients and need to reverse trains proved to be a serious bottleneck to traffic on the line, and there were several accidents with runaway trains at the reversing points. Attempts were made to mitigate this by realigning the track and relocating and extending the reversing stations, but the problems continued. This was said to provide little gain for the cost proposed. In 1908, work began on the Ten Tunnels Deviation, a double-tracked route that by-passed the two reversing stations and the upper two inclines, although retaining the Bottom Road with its 1:42 gradient. Once this was completed, the by-passed section was closed in October 1910.

Lithgow Valley Reserve
The main railway corridor of the Great Zig Zag Railway forms part of a Reserve administered by Government, it is administered by a trust made up of volunteers. The area was proclaimed a public reserve in 1881 one of the first public reserves in NSW, originally supervised by Blaxland Shire Council. In 1946 it was added to the Trust that administered Hassan's Walls, the trust opened Top Road to road traffic in 1949, in 1964 it added the picnic shelter under number 1 Viaduct, naming it in recognition of H K Cockerton Place. Cockerton served as a trustee for 17 years, instigating the development of the reserve, in 1969 the Reserve was transferred to Lithgow Council. 1990 the Reserve was placed in the Trust of the Zig Zag Railway Co-Op.

Revival and preservation

As the end of steam operation in New South Wales approached, in 1967 a group of steam enthusiasts headed by Ian Thornton were keen to establish an operating steam museum. The Lithgow Zig Zag was chosen as a suitable site based on its accessibility by day-trippers from Sydney, its scenery, abundant water supplies and availability of coal. In March 1969 negotiations commenced with the Zig Zag Trust, the Department of Lands and the Lithgow City Council.

In 1972 the Lithgow Switchback Railway Co-op Limited was formed and this became the Zig Zag Railway Co-operative Limited in 1974. At this time, the Commissioner for Railways only made heritage locomotives and rolling stock available to the officially sponsored New South Wales Rail Transport Museum. Thus the line was relaid to  narrow gauge as used in Queensland, South Australia and Tasmania rather than the New South Wales  to allow locomotives and carriages to be procured from these states.

In 1975 the new track was complete on the Middle Road between Bottom Points and Top Points. On 29 August 1975 1046 operated the first journey from Bottom Points to Top Points. Services commenced on 18 October 1975, the 106th anniversary of the original opening.

On 4 April 1987 the line was opened along the Top Road between Top Points and Mt Sinai Halt and on 29 October 1988 through to Clarence. A further extension to meet the Main Western line at Newnes Junction has been started with track laid for 50% of the distance.

Closure and Bushfire damage

Accreditation and collision
In August 2006 the Independent Transport Safety Regulator (ITSR), an agency of the Government of New South Wales that regulates safety and accredits railway operators, identified the Zig Zag Railway (and one other operator) as a "higher risk" isolated line operator because of its complex operations and high numbers of passenger trips. The ITSR gave Zig Zag Co-operative additional time to develop a safety improvement plan in order to comply with the Act, that took effect for all heritage railway operators from 1 January 2007.

On 1 April 2011 an incident occurred resulting in a collision between a maintenance vehicle and a two-car rail motor, between Clarence and Top Points stations. Travelling in opposite directions and carrying one passenger (in the Hy-rail) plus one driver of each rail vehicle, two injuries were sustained. A subsequent investigation by the Office of Transport Safety Investigations found that the principal error was miscommunication. The inquiry also identified that a number of other factors were found to have contributed to the collision.

From March 2012 only railcars could be operated and in June 2012 the ITSR ordered a cessation of all services until a number of safety issues were addressed. The railway was then aiming to resume services in October 2013.

2013 Bushfire and storm damage
The railway was severely damaged by the 'State Mine Fire', part of the October 2013 bushfires. The railway suffered millions of dollars of damage which included ten passenger carriages and four accommodation carriages. The most extensive damage caused by the fires was at Bottom Points workshop where most of the north side was destroyed. This included the spare parts stores, offices and most of the machine shop. Electrical equipment to operate signals was totally destroyed as was the repeater tower for the safety radio communication system and the internal telephone lines and exchange. One thousand new railway sleepers were also lost as was the caretaker's converted accommodation carriage. Locomotive 1047 which had been stored behind Bottom Points workshop was also badly damaged Much of the damage was suffered by original railway equipment from the 1920s. At that time it was estimated that the railway would take a full year to recover from the State Mine Fire. Heavy rain then caused subsequent damage to an embankment near the western end of the Clarence tunnel, the platform area at Top Points, and to the run around loop track at Bottom Points.
 
In September 2017 restoration of vehicles and infrastructure were still being undertaken and hopes were for recommencement of services as soon as safe and practical. Due to the complexity of repairs and reinstatement infrastructure, the re-opening was hoped for late 2019, but all hopes were dashed with the damage from the 2019 bushfires. The railway’s website and facebook page both have updates on the redevelopment.

2019 Bushfire damage and ongoing repairs
In late December 2019 the Zig Zag Railway was hit by the Gospers Mountain bushfire.
The station buildings and most of the rolling stock survived with the exception of a few already vandalised carriages. The toilet block, storage areas, communications hut, signalling equipment, water and power supplies and main office with the past 45 years of records were all destroyed along with an estimated 1500 sleepers all of which pushed the reopening a few years back.

On 24 July 2020 diesel locomotive 1004 became the first locomotive to travel from Bottom Points Station to Clarence station since the cessation of steam services in March 2012. Works trains had previously only operated on the Middle Road (Bottom Points to Top Points) due to the extensive damage at Clarence caused by the 2013 embankment slip.

2020 Storm Damage and COVID
In March 2020 the railway was well into the project of making the rail corridor safe when storms struck Zig Zag, this impacted the return to service the railway was heading for. The ability of workers and volunteers to come onsite was impacted by COVID-19 restrictions in NSW between March and September 2020 and June and November 2021, slowing the progress of work on the railway. Additionally, the railway has been repeatedly affected by weather events, such as storms in January and March 2022.

Despite these setbacks, the railway has made significant progress towards a return to revenue operations, including commissioning steam locomotive 218A ("The Yank") in June 2021, refurbishing the carpark and station precinct at Clarence, and continually training personnel to operate the rail network ahead of reopening in early 2023.

Former schedule
Prior to the suspension of services in 2012, the Zig Zag Railways was unique in New South Wales being the only heritage operator to run every day except Christmas Day. On Mondays, Tuesdays, Thursdays, Fridays and Sundays railmotors were operated. Every Wednesday, Saturday and Sunday a steam locomotive with train would operate with Sunday having a two train timetable. Special events included Day out with Thomas and a Wizards Express event held a couple of times per year. During most school holidays steam services ran every day. Passengers could join the service at Bottom Points where Zig Zag railway station is served by NSW TrainLink services from Sydney or at Clarence which is adjacent to the Bells Line of Road.

Locomotives and rolling stock
The locomotives and rolling stock on the Zig Zag Railway have been mainly sourced from Queensland Railways but there are also items from the South Australian Railways and Emu Bay Railway.

The collection includes Queensland Railways 2000 class rail motors, Queensland Railways Evans carriages, Emu Bay Railway diesel locomotives, South Australian Railways end platform carriages and several older carriages and a considerable number of freight style vehicles that are used for demonstration trains, fire fighting, and track and infrastructure repair and maintenance.

Steam locomotives

Diesel locomotives

Railmotors

Passenger carriages 
During the early 1970s four ex-NSWR sleeping cars were located at the Bottom Points of the Zig Zag to provide stationary sleeping accommodation, meal and ablution facilities for its volunteer train crews and workers. Unfortunately these were all destroyed by the 2013 fires

Five South Australian Railways end platform carriages made redundant by the opening of the standard gauge Broken Hill railway line were purchased in 1972 and these were used to inaugurate services. A set of five end platform carriages was purchased in 1974 from the Public Transport Commission of NSW but ultimately not used when 15 Evans side door compartment carriages were purchased from Queensland Railways in 1986 went into service instead. Subsequently additional carriages were purchased from the Beaudesert Railway.

Freight and works vehicles 
Zig Zag Railway has a variety of four-wheeled and eight-wheeled freight, fire fighting, and works vehicles. These include fuel and water tank cars, hopper wagons, flat wagons and covered and louvered vans. These vehicles have been sourced from NSW, Queensland, South Australia, Northern Territory, and Tasmania. It also had one Hi-Rail vehicle (that can operate on road or rail).

Film use
In 2003 the railway was used in the production of the Hollywood film Stealth. The area stood in for mountainous regions in North Korea and locomotives were specially painted with Korean Chosongul (Hangul) characters.

References

Further reading

External links

3 ft 6 in gauge railways in Australia
Australian companies established in 1975
Heritage railways in Australia
History of the Blue Mountains (New South Wales)
Railway companies established in 1975
Railways with Zig Zags
Tourist railways in New South Wales
Tourist attractions in New South Wales